Bjørge Fedje is a former Norwegian football goalkeeper, now a goalkeeping coach for Arendal Fotball.

He previously played for local club Sogndal Fotball, where he appeared in three Norwegian Premier games in 2004. He then joined Årdal FK, but left the club in 2006. In 2006, he was on trial at Cambridge United. He joined second-tier team Manglerud Star, and then went to Eikefjord IL in 2007 but returned to MS Oslo later that year as a player and goalkeeping coach. In 2008, he joined FK Mandalskameratene as their new goalkeeping coach.

References

Year of birth missing (living people)
Living people
Norwegian footballers
Association football goalkeepers
Årdal FK players